Washington News Service may refer to:
Washington News Service, a private news service based in Washington, DC 
Washington News Service, a bureau of the Public News Service based in Washington state
stories produced at the Washington, DC campus of Boston University for the BU News Service